Hathian is a village and union council in Mardan District of Khyber Pakhtunkhwa. It is located at 34°23'35N 71°55'0E and has an altitude of 372m (1223 feet).

References

Union councils of Mardan District
Populated places in Mardan District